Crudine River, a watercourse that is part of the Macquarie catchment within the Murray–Darling basin, is located in the central western district of New South Wales, Australia.

The Crudine River rises on the western slopes of the Great Dividing Range in the Capertee Valley, north of Ilford, and flows generally to the north-north–west, west, and then south-south–west, before forming its confluence with the Turon River west of Sofala; dropping  over the course of its  length.

See also
Rivers of New South Wales
List of rivers of Australia

References

External links
 

Rivers of New South Wales
Murray-Darling basin
Australian gold rushes